Burrow-with-Burrow is a civil parish in Lancaster, Lancashire, England. It contains 25 listed buildings that are recorded in the National Heritage List for England.  Of these, one is listed at Grade I, the highest of the three grades, one is at Grade II*, the middle grade, and the others are at Grade II, the lowest grade.  It contains a number of small settlements, including Nether Burrow, Over Burrow, Overtown and Cowan Bridge, and is otherwise rural.  The major building in the parish is Burrow Hall; this country house and structures associated with it are listed.  Most of the older listed buildings are domestic or agricultural, including houses and associated structures, farmhouses, and farm buildings.  Later listed structures are four milestones and four boundary stones.  The other listed buildings are a bridge, and inscribed stones re-set into a different bridge.

Key

Buildings

References

Citations

Sources

Lists of listed buildings in Lancashire
Buildings and structures in the City of Lancaster